The 2018–19 Ole Miss Rebels men's basketball team represented the University of Mississippi in the 2018–19 NCAA Division I men's basketball season, their 109th basketball season. The Rebels were led by first-year, SEC Coach of the Year, Kermit Davis. The Rebels played their games at The Pavilion at Ole Miss in Oxford, Mississippi as members of the Southeastern Conference. The Rebels had an eight-win improvement from their previous season, which was eleventh best in Division I. The Rebels returned to the NCAA Tournament for the first time since 2015, where they were defeated in the first round by 9th seeded Oklahoma.

Previous season
The Rebels finished the 2017–18 season 12–20, 5–13 in SEC play to finish in last place. They lost in the first round of the SEC tournament to South Carolina.

On February 12, 2018, 12th-year head coach Andy Kennedy, the school's all-time winningest head coach, and the school mutually agreed to part ways following the end of the season. However, on February 19, Kennedy announced that he would depart immediately, with assistant Madlock taking over on an interim basis. On March 15, 2018, it was announced that Ole Miss had hired Middle Tennessee head coach Kermit Davis as head coach of the Rebels.

Offseason

Departures

Incoming transfers

2018 recruiting class

Roster

Schedule and results

|-
!colspan=12 style=|Exhibition

|-
!colspan=12 style=|Regular season

|-
!colspan=12 style=| SEC tournament

|-
!colspan=12 style=| NCAA tournament

Rankings

*AP does not release post-NCAA Tournament rankings^Coaches did not release a Week 2 poll.

References 

Ole Miss
Ole Miss Rebels men's basketball seasons
Ole Miss Rebels basketball
Ole Miss Rebels basketball
Ole Miss